Dick and Dom's Hoopla was a CBBC children's entertainment television series presented by the duo Dick and Dom (Richard McCourt and Dominic Wood).  It was first broadcast in September 2012 and was shown every Friday evening on the CBBC Channel. The show saw the duo running their own travelling funfair and contestants of all ages play games to try to get to the finale. As well as games in the usual surreal style of Dick and Dom, there was also performers, acts and celebrity appearances.

The show had a positive reaction, however in December 2012, it was reported that Ofcom was to investigate the programme after two competitors were seen retching into a bucket after playing a game. The show aired for one series.

References

External links
 Dick and Dom's Hoopla February 2013

BBC children's television shows